Mary Sutherland (4 May 1893 – 11 March 1955) was a notable New Zealand forester and botanist. She was born in London, England in 1893.

Biography

Early life
Sutherland was born in London on 4 May 1893 to Nellie Miller Sutherland and her husband, David Sutherland, a medical wine manufacturer.

Education
Sutherland was educated at the City of London School for Girls and the University College of North Wales, Bangor, where she took a Bachelor of Science degree in Forestry. She was the first woman in both the United Kingdom and the British Empire to complete a Bachelor of Science in forestry.

Career
During the First World War she served in the Women's National Land Army in Britain. Later she was forewoman forester in estates in Renfrewshire and Inverness-shire. She also served as an assistant experimental officer with the British Forestry Commission. In 1922 she lost her position. This was as a result of reductions in expenditure by the British Forestry Commission brought about by recommendations from Sir Eric Geddes's Committee on National Expenditure .

In New Zealand a State Forest Service had been established in 1921. This Service was under the direction of the Canadian-trained forester Leon MacIntosh Ellis. Sutherland was attracted to New Zealand because she felt it offered forestry conditions similar to those in the United Kingdom. She emigrated to New Zealand in about 1924 and attended a three-week introductory course for rangers of the New Zealand Forest Service at Whakarewarewa. During this course Sutherland was required to stay at the Geyer Hotel instead of camp with the other rangers. This attitude to women rangers resulted in a financial disincentive for the Forest Service to send Sutherland into the field. However, despite it she managed to obtain a permanent appointment in 1925 with the Forest Service. She was employed at the Wellington and Rotorua offices to do investigative work in silviculture.

In 1924 she had become a member of the Empire Forestry Association and was appointed a Fellow of the Society of Foresters of Great Britain in 1928.

In 1929 she undertook research for a paper entitled A microscopical study of the structure of the leaves of the genus pinus, which was published in the Transactions and Proceedings of the New Zealand Institute in 1933.

During the years 1933 to 1936 New Zealand was suffering an economic depression which resulted in the Forest Service making severe cutbacks.  These retrenchments included Sutherland's specialty area of research. She was laid off, and spent these years working at the Dominion Museum in Wellington. However she did serve on the Council of the New Zealand Forestry League in 1936. Sutherland remained at the Dominion Museum until 1946. Initially working as a clerk, she was eventually obtained a position as a botanist. She presented a paper at the Pacific Science Congress in 1933. In 1937 Sutherland returned to the Forest Service as a botanist.

The New Zealand Institute of Foresters (NZIF), established in 1927, lists Sutherland among its founding members. She supported the institute's aims and activities, serving as a councillor in 1935 and as vice-president in 1940-41. Her design of a sprig of fruiting rimu was voted into the NZIF official seal.

In 1946 she was seconded to the Department of Agriculture as a farm forestry officer. While in this new position she started her pioneering work in agricultural forestry. She was in charge the layout of plantations at the Department's Winchmore Irrigation Research Station and Invermay Agricultural Research Station. Between 1947 and 1949 she published a significant series of articles in the New Zealand Journal of Agriculture on the advantages to be gained when planting trees on farms.  These articles formed the basis for the 1951 Department of Agriculture bulletin on homestead shelter planting. In 1950 she contributed a chapter, Native vegetation, to the Department of Agriculture publication Farming in New Zealand.

Death
Sutherland's career was cut short when ill heath suffered during field-work in Central Otago during 1954 led to her death. Sutherland died in Wellington on March 11, 1955.

Legacy
Sutherland left a bequest of £100 to the New Zealand Institute of Foresters for the establishment of "a fund for overseas study, or [to] be used to further the aims of the institute". Her contribution to forestry continues to be commemorated each year with the presentation of the Mary Sutherland Award granted to a student member of the New Zealand Institute of Foresters, and also by the Mary Sutherland Prize at Bangor University, awarded to the best female forestry graduate from Bangor University. In 2017, Sutherland was selected as one of the Royal Society Te Apārangi's "150 women in 150 words", celebrating the contributions of women to knowledge in New Zealand.

References

External links
Photographs of Mary Sutherland  
Royal Society of New Zealand article on Mary Sutherland 

1893 births
1955 deaths
New Zealand foresters
20th-century New Zealand botanists
English emigrants to New Zealand
Women in forestry
20th-century New Zealand women scientists
New Zealand women botanists
People educated at the City of London School for Girls